Sega Genesis Classics (released as Sega Mega Drive Classics in PAL regions) is a series of compilations featuring Sega Genesis video games released for Windows, Linux, macOS, PlayStation 4, Xbox One and Nintendo Switch. The collections are split into "Volumes", with the first four receiving both physical and digital releases and the fifth volume only being digitally released.

Background
Sega re-released the first four physically released volumes as the Sega Genesis Classic Collection: Gold Edition (Sega Mega Drive Classics: Gold Edition in PAL regions), for Windows. It is a four-disc set of the forty-six Sega Genesis games from the first four volumes. The collection has configuring keyboard support which provides a personalised gaming experience, a well as a multiplayer mode for a select number of titles. The collection also has save and load functionality that is included in all of the games that allows the player to pick up and play saved games at the exact point they left off.

Sega released a free application on Steam on April 28, 2016, called the Sega Genesis Classics Hub (Sega Mega Drive Classics Hub in PAL regions). The application presents a virtual hub, themed after what a bedroom of a Sega fanatic might be like, to play all of the released Sega Genesis games through it. The Hub includes Steam Workshop integration, supporting ROM hacks for these games; within a day of its release, several previously developed ROM hacks were added by users to the Hubs Workshop. Any Sega Genesis games previously purchased on Steam, including collections, are automatically added to players' game libraries in the Hub. A few weeks following the release of the Hub, Sega reported more than 350,000 new purchases of the various games supported by the new software. The Sega Mega Drive and Genesis Classics compilation has sold 1,514,485 digital units on Steam, .

Sega released a compilation of all of the games included in compilations listed below with some exceptions in an entry simply titled Sega Genesis Classics (Sega Mega Drive Classics in PAL regions) for Linux, macOS, PlayStation 4 and Xbox One on May 29, 2018. It uses the same interface as Sega Genesis Classics Hub, but with added features such as achievements and rewinding in-game. These features were later added to the Sega Genesis Classics Hub. Additionally, select games can be played in their Japanese versions. The compilation released on Nintendo Switch on December 6, 2018. The Steam version of the collection used to exclude the Sonic the Hedgehog and ToeJam & Earl games. The former could only be purchased as a part of Sonic-related compilations, but are now included in the Steam collection. All games can be purchased separately, but the Sonic games are sold at higher prices.

On May 20, 2022, Sonic the Hedgehog, Sonic the Hedgehog 2, Sonic the Hedgehog 3 & Knuckles and Sonic CD were removed from individual and compilations sale on Steam, to be replaced by the Sonic Origins compilation which includes those titles.

List of games

†: Only available in the physical disc release.
@: Only available in the digital download release.
^: Not available in Nintendo Switch version.
#: Includes alternate region version. Alien Soldier, Dynamite Headdy, Ristar, and Streets of Rage 2 have Japanese versions. Streets of Rage 3 includes European English & Japanese versions. Beyond Oasis includes the French, German, Spanish, and Japanese versions. Landstalker has French and German versions included.
*: Removed from sale on May 20, 2022. Replaced by Sonic Origins.

Reception

Sega Genesis Classics received "generally favorable" reviews, according to review aggregator Metacritic.

Notes and references

2010 video games
Linux games
MacOS games
Nintendo Switch games
PlayStation 4 games
Sega video games
Sega Games franchises
Sega video game compilations
Video games developed in the United Kingdom
Windows games
Xbox One games